Chandler Levack is a Canadian writer and filmmaker. She is a two-time Juno Award nominee for Video of the Year, receiving nominations alongside Jeremy Schaulin-Rioux at the Juno Awards of 2015 for directing PUP's "Guilt Trip" music video, and at the Juno Awards of 2016 for directing PUP's "Dark Days" music video. She was also a Prism Prize nominee for both "Guilt Trip" and "Dark Days", and has also directed music videos for DZ Deathrays and Jeremy Dutcher.

Levack has been an arts and entertainment writer for publications including Eye Weekly, Toronto Life, SPIN, The Globe and Mail, and the Toronto Star.

Her debut as a narrative filmmaker, the short film We Forgot to Break Up, premiered at the 2017 Toronto International Film Festival, and won the award for Best Canadian Short Film at the 2017 Whistler Film Festival. 

I Like Movies, Levack's debut feature film, premiered in the Discovery program at the 2022 Toronto International Film Festival. Levack won the $10,000 RBC Emerging Artist Award at the 2022 Calgary International Film Festival for the film.

References

External links

Canadian women film directors
Canadian women journalists
Canadian music video directors
Canadian film critics
Canadian Film Centre alumni
Living people
Year of birth missing (living people)